The Massachusetts Police Association is a fraternal and advocacy organization for police officers in Massachusetts.

It conducts an annual golf outing, awards its own Medals of Honor and Valor to those who are killed in the line of duty and offers discounts for insurance and other products. The group also provides a legal defense fund. Its publication is The Sentinel.

References

Organizations based in Massachusetts
Law enforcement non-governmental organizations in the United States